The Soho Hotel is a luxury 5-star hotel in London, England. Located at 4 Richmond Mews in Soho, the hotel has 96 bedrooms and suites, each one individually designed by Firmdale Hotels’ co-owner and Creative Director, Kit Kemp. The hotel's Refuel Restaurant & Bar serves breakfast, brunch, lunch, afternoon tea and dinner a la carte. The restaurant also has a covered and heated outdoor dining area on the hotel's forecourt. The Soho Hotel has two screen rooms and three private event rooms; the Crimson Bar and Indigo and Sandra Blow Rooms.

References

Hotels in the City of Westminster
Soho, London